Lactamide is an amide derived from lactic acid.  It is a white crystalline solid with a melting point of 73-76 °C.

Lactamide can be prepared by the catalytic hydration of lactonitrile.

References

Carboxamides